The Evening Hour is a 2020 American drama film, directed by Braden King from a screenplay by Elizabeth Palmore. It is based upon the 2012 novel of the same name by Carter Sickels. It stars Philip Ettinger, Stacy Martin, Cosmo Jarvis, Michael Trotter, Kerry Bishé and Lili Taylor.

It had its world premiere at the Sundance Film Festival on January 27, 2020. It was released on July 30, 2021 by Strand Releasing.

Plot
Cole works as a nursing aide at an elderly care facility in rural Appalachia. As a side job, he redistributes excess medication from residents to local buyers. Cole sees himself as a caretaker who keeps addicts out of the path of the town’s drug kingpin. His double life becomes suddenly threatened when a childhood friend returns after years away with plans to follow Cole into the local drug trade.

Cast
 Philip Ettinger as Cole Freeman
 Stacy Martin as Charlotte Carson
 Cosmo Jarvis as Terry Rose
 Michael Trotter as Reese Campbell
 Kerry Bishé as Lacy Cooper
 Lili Taylor as Ruby Freeman
 Marc Menchaca as Everett
 Ross Partridge as Randy
 Frank Hoyt Taylor as Clyde Freeman
 Tess Harper as Dorothy Freeman

Production
In March 2016, it was announced Cynthia Nixon, Brian Geraghty, Marin Ireland and Michael Trotter had joined the cast of the film, with Braden King directing from a screenplay by Elizabeth Palmore based upon the 2012 novel of the same name by Carter Sickels. In November 2018, it was announced Philip Ettinger, Stacy Martin, Cosmo Jarvis, Kerry Bishé, Lili Taylor, Marc Menchaca, Tess Harper and Frank Hoyt Taylor had joined the cast of the film, replacing Nixon, Geraghty and Ireland.

Release
It had its world premiere at the Sundance Film Festival on January 27, 2020. In December 2020, Strand Releasing acquired U.S. distribution rights to the film. It was released on July 30, 2021.

Reception

Critical response

References

External links
 

2020 films
2020 independent films
American drama films
Films based on American novels
2020 drama films
2020s English-language films
2020s American films